SS Albert C. Field was a Canadian cargo ship, sunk during World War II. 

The ship was built by the Furness Shipbuilding Company of Haverton Hill, and launched on 28 May 1923. Her first owner was the Eastern Steamship Company of St. Catharines, Ontario. She was sold to the Upper Lakes & St. Lawrence Transportation Company, also of St. Catharines, in 1937.

The ship was requisitioned by the British government during World War II. On 16 June 1944 Albert C. Field sailed from Penarth as part of Convoy EBC-14 bound for the Normandy beachhead. She was carrying 2,500 tons of munitions and 1,300 bags of mail. The ship was hit by a torpedo and sank within three minutes. Four of the crew were killed.

The wreckage is badly damaged. There are several small pieces of exploded ammunition. The machinery is right aft and the bridge is right forward while everything in the middle was cargo space.

In May 2019, the UK Government designated the Albert Field Marine Conservation Zone, which covers approximately 192km2 and includes this wreck site.

References

1923 ships
Ships built on the River Tees
Steamships of Canada
Ships sunk by German aircraft
World War II shipwrecks in the English Channel
Maritime incidents in June 1944
Wreck diving sites in the United Kingdom
Ships sunk by German submarines in World War II